Zinsou is a surname. Notable people with the surname include:

Émile Derlin Zinsou (1918–2016), Beninese political figure and physician
Lionel Zinsou (born 1954), French economist and investment banker
Marie-Cécile Zinsou (born 1982), French-Beninese art historian and entrepreneur
Sénouvo Agbota Zinsou (born 1946), Togolese playwright and theater director